The Archdiocese of Los Angeles is an ecclesiastical territory or archdiocese of the Catholic Church (particularly the Roman Catholic or Latin Church) located in the southern portion of the U.S. state of California. The archdiocese’s cathedra is in Los Angeles, the archdiocese comprises the California counties of Los Angeles, Santa Barbara and Ventura. The cathedral is the Cathedral of Our Lady of the Angels in Los Angeles, and its present archbishop is José Horacio Gómez Velasco. With approximately five million professing members, the Archdiocese of Los Angeles is numerically the single largest diocese in the United States.

The Archbishop of Los Angeles also serves as metropolitan bishop of the suffragan dioceses within the Ecclesiastical Province of Los Angeles, which includes the dioceses of Fresno, Monterey, Orange, San Bernardino, and San Diego.

Following the establishment of the Spanish missions in California, the diocese of the Two Californias was established on 1840, when the Los Angeles region was still part of Mexico. In 1848, Mexican California was ceded to the United States, and the U.S. portion of the diocese was renamed the Diocese of Monterey. The diocese was renamed the Diocese of Monterey-Los Angeles in 1859, and the episcopal see was moved to Los Angeles upon the completion of the Cathedral of Saint Vibiana in 1876. Los Angeles split from Monterey to become the Diocese of Los Angeles-San Diego in 1922. The diocese was split again in 1936 to create the Diocese of San Diego, and the Los Angeles see was elevated to an archdiocese. The archdiocese's present territory was established in 1976, when Orange County was split off to establish the Diocese of Orange.

History
With the papal bull Apostolicam sollicitudinem of 27 April 1840, Pope Gregory XVI set up a new episcopal see, to which he gave the name of Diocese of California (also interchangeably called "Diocese of Two Californias" or "Diocese of Both Californias"). He assigned to it a vast territory taken from that of the Diocese of Sonora, now the Archdiocese of Hermosillo in Mexico. It included Alta California, encompassing the present states of California, Nevada, Arizona, Utah, western Colorado and southwestern Wyoming, and the Baja California Territory, encompassing the modern Mexican states of Baja California and Baja California Sur. He set the episcopal residence at San Diego and made the diocese a suffragan of the Archdiocese of Mexico City.  Francisco Garcia Diego y Moreno, OFM became the first bishop of the new diocese, with Mission Santa Barbara serving as its pro-cathedral.

After ceding Alta California to the United States at the close of the Mexican–American War, the government of Mexico objected to a bishop based in the United States having jurisdiction over parishes in Mexican Baja California. The Holy See divided the diocese into American and Mexican sections.  On 20 November 1849, with the episcopal residence moved to Monterey, a more central position for the new diocese, the American section became the Diocese of Monterey.  The Royal Presidio Chapel in Monterey served as the pro-cathedral of the American diocese.

In 1853, Pope Pius IX erected the Metropolitan Archdiocese of San Francisco, taking the territory that now constitutes Nevada, Utah, and much of northern California from the diocese and making the diocese a suffragan thereof.

In 1859, the same pope renamed of the diocese to Diocese of Monterey-Los Angeles to recognize the growth of the city of Los Angeles.  The bishop moved his principal residence to Los Angeles and used the Mission of Santa Barbara as a pro-cathedral until the Cathedral of Saint Vibiana opened in 1876.

On June 1, 1922, Pope Pius XI renamed the diocese again, making it the Diocese of Los Angeles-San Diego, and simultaneously erected a new diocese, named the Diocese of Monterey-Fresno, in what had become northern portion of its territory after the erection of the Archdiocese of San Francisco.  This changed the title of Bishop John Joseph Cantwell from Bishop of Monterey-Los Angeles to bishop Los Angeles-San Diego, which then comprised the counties of Imperial, Los Angeles, Orange, Riverside, San Bernardino, San Diego, Santa Barbara, and Ventura.

On July 11, 1936, the same pope elevated and renamed the diocese as the Metropolitan Archdiocese of Los Angeles, with John Joseph Cantwell becoming the first archbishop of Los Angeles, concurrently erecting the Diocese of San Diego with the territory of Imperial, Riverside, San Bernardino, and San Diego Counties, and designated the new Diocese of San Diego and the Diocese of Monterey-Fresno as suffragan of the new metropolitan see.

Pope Paul VI subsequently split each of the three dioceses of the Metropolitan Province of Los Angeles into two.
 On 6 October 1967, he suppressed the Diocese of Monterey-Fresno and erected the present Diocese of Fresno and the present Diocese of Monterey in California, splitting in the territory of the suppressed diocese between them making both new dioceses also suffragans of the Metropolitan Archdiocese of Los Angeles.  The inclusion of "in California" in the title of the latter of the new dioceses differentiates it from other dioceses with see cities that have the same name.
 On 24 March 1976, he erected Diocese of Orange, taking Orange County from the Archdiocese of Los Angeles and making the new diocese a suffragan of the Metropolitan Archdiocese of Los Angeles.  This action also established the present territory of the Archdiocese of Los Angeles, consisting of Los Angeles, Santa Barbara, and Ventura Counties.
 On 14 July 1978, he erected the Diocese of San Bernardino, taking San Bernardino and Riverside Counties from the Diocese of San Diego and making the new diocese also a suffragan of the Metropolitan Archdiocese of Los Angeles.

These actions established the present configuration of the Metropolitan Province of Los Angeles.

Pastoral regions
In 1986, Roger Mahony designated five geographical administrative pastoral regions, each led by an auxiliary bishop who functions as the region's episcopal vicar. The five regions are:
 Our Lady of the Angels, covering downtown and central Los Angeles west to Malibu, south to Los Angeles International Airport. The region has the cathedral, 78 parishes, 10 Catholic high schools, 5 Catholic hospitals, 1 cemetery, 3 parochial missions, 1 seminary, and no Spanish missions. The episcopal vicar is Msgr. Terrance Fleming 
 San Fernando, covering the San Fernando, Santa Clarita and Antelope Valleys and northeast Los Angeles. The region has 54 parishes, 12 Catholic high schools, 2 Catholic hospitals, 2 cemeteries, 7 parochial missions, 1 active duty military chapel installation, and 1 Spanish mission. Gómez appointed Alejandro D. Aclan as episcopal vicar for the San Fernando pastoral region in 2019.
 San Gabriel, covering East Los Angeles through the San Gabriel Valley and the Pomona Valley. The region has 66 parishes, 13 Catholic high schools, 3 Catholic hospitals, 4 cemeteries, 2 parochial missions and 1 Spanish mission. 
 San Pedro, covering Long Beach and southern Los Angeles County. The region has 67 parishes, 9 Catholic high schools, 6 Catholic hospitals, 1 cemetery, 1 active duty military chapel installation, and 1 parochial mission. Gómez appointed Marc V. Trudeau as episcopal vicar for this region in 2018.
 Santa Barbara, covering Santa Barbara and Ventura Counties. The region has 37 parishes, 6 Catholic high schools, 3 Catholic hospitals, 4 cemeteries, 3 active duty military chapel installations, 6 parochial missions and 4 Spanish missions. Currently Vacated

Clergy sexual abuse settlements

On July 16, 2007, Cardinal Roger Mahony and the archdiocese reached a record-breaking settlement with 508 alleged victims of sexual abuse by priests. The settlement was worth $660 million, with an average of $1.3 million for each plaintiff. Mahony described the abuse as a "terrible sin and crime", after a series of trials into sex abuse claims since the 1940s were to begin. The agreement settled all outstanding civil lawsuits against the archdiocese and dwarfs the $157 million settlement paid by the Archdiocese of Boston since Massachusetts law places a legal dollar cap on how much money a non-profit group can be required to pay.

In 2014 the diocese agreed to pay $13 million to settle a final group of 17 sex abuse lawsuits, including eleven that involved "a visiting Mexican priest who fled prosecution and remains a fugitive more than 25 years later". The settlement followed a court order forcing the Archdiocese to release files which showed that it had shielded accused priests, for example by ordering church officials not to turn over a list of altar boys to police who were investigating.

From May to December 2019, the Archdiocese of Los Angeles provided numerous documents to California State Attorney Xavier Becerra in preparation for a series of pending lawsuits which are expected to be filed after a new California law which will temporarily remove the statute of limitations. The new law went into effect on January 1, 2020. The Archdiocese of Los Angeles is one of six Catholic dioceses throughout the state of California which is expected to be subpoenaed during the upcoming lawsuits. In January 2020, it was reported that the Archdiocese of Los Angeles settled a sexual abuse case against a former Archdiocese priest for $1.9 million.

Archbishop

The archdiocese is led by the archbishop, who governs from the mother church, the Cathedral of Our Lady of the Angels. The cathedral was dedicated on September 2, 2002, and replaced the former Cathedral of Saint Vibiana, damaged in the 1994 Northridge earthquake.

The Archbishop of Los Angeles is the metropolitan of the Province of Los Angeles of the Catholic Church.  Its suffragans are the dioceses of Fresno, Monterey in California, Orange in California, San Bernardino, and San Diego. Metropolitan archbishops historically wielded great administrative powers over the suffragan dioceses. Today, such power is only ceremonial and kept as a tradition.

The Most Reverend José H. Gómez is the current archbishop of Los Angeles, having automatically succeeded his predecessor, Cardinal Roger Mahony, who served for 25 years, upon the latter's retirement which took effect on March 1, 2011. Previously, Gómez served as Coadjutor Archbishop of Los Angeles since his appointment by Pope Benedict XVI on April 6, 2010. He previously served as Archbishop of San Antonio from 2004 to 2010, and as an auxiliary bishop of the Archdiocese of Denver from 2001 to 2004. He is an ordained priest of Opus Dei.

Archbishop Gómez is assisted by the current auxiliary bishops: Marc Vincent Trudeau and Alejandro D. Aclan. In addition, Edward W. Clark, Joseph Martin Sartoris and Gerald Eugene Wilkerson are retired auxiliary bishops still living and residing within the archdiocese.

Bishops

Bishop of California (Two Californias, Both Californias)
 Francisco Garcia Diego y Moreno (1840–1846)

Bishop of Monterey
 Joseph Alemany (1850–1853), appointed Archbishop of San Francisco

Bishops of Monterey-Los Angeles
 Thaddeus Amat y Brusi (1853–1878)
 Francisco Mora y Borrell (1878–1896; coadjutor bishop 1873–1878)
 George Thomas Montgomery (1896–1902; coadjutor bishop 1894–1896), appointed Coadjutor Archbishop of San Francisco but died before succession to that see
 Thomas James Conaty (1903–1915)
 John Joseph Cantwell (1917–1922), title changed with title of diocese

Bishop of Los Angeles-San Diego
 John Joseph Cantwell (1922–1936), elevated to Archbishop of Los Angeles

Archbishops of Los Angeles
 John Joseph Cantwell (1936–1947)
 James Francis McIntyre (1948–1970)
 Timothy Manning (1970–1985)
 Roger Mahony (1985–2011)
 José Horacio Gómez (2011–present; coadjutor archbishop 2010–2011)

Current auxiliary bishops of Los Angeles
 Vacant - Our Lady of the Angels Pastoral Region
 Vacant – San Gabriel Pastoral Region
 Vacant – Santa Barbara Pastoral Region
 Marc Vincent Trudeau (2018–present) – San Pedro Pastoral Region
 Alejandro D. Aclan (2019–present) – San Fernando Pastoral Region

Former auxiliary bishops of Los Angeles
 Joseph Thomas McGucken (1941–1955), appointed Bishop of Sacramento and later Archbishop of San Francisco
 Timothy Manning (1946–1967), appointed Bishop of Fresno and later Coadjutor Archbishop and Archbishop of Los Angeles(see above); created Cardinal in 1973
 Alden John Bell (1956–1962), appointed Bishop of Sacramento
 John J. Ward (1963–1996)
 Joseph Patrick Dougherty (1969–1970)
 William Robert Johnson (1971–1976), appointed Bishop of Orange
 Juan Alfredo Arzube (1971–1993)
 Thaddeus Anthony Shubsda (1976–1982), appointed Bishop of Monterey in California
 Manuel Duran Moreno (1976–1982), appointed Coadjutor Bishop and later Bishop of Tucson
 Donald William Montrose (1983–1985), appointed Bishop of Stockton
 William Levada (1983–1986), appointed Archbishop of Portland in Oregon and later Archbishop of San Francisco and Prefect of Congregation for the Doctrine of the Faith (elevated to Cardinal in 2006)
 Carl Anthony Fisher (1986–1993)
 Armando Xavier Ochoa (1986–1996), appointed Bishop of El Paso and later Bishop of Fresno
 George Patrick Ziemann (1986–1992), appointed Bishop of Santa Rosa in California
 Sylvester Donovan Ryan (1990–1992), appointed Bishop of Monterey in California
 Stephen Blaire (1990–1999), appointed Bishop of Stockton
 Thomas John Curry (1994–2018)
 Joseph Martin Sartoris (1994–2002)
 Gabino Zavala (1994–2012)
 Gerald Eugene Wilkerson (1997–2015)
 Edward W. Clark (2001–2022)
 Oscar Azarcon Solis (2003–2017), appointed Bishop of Salt Lake City
 Alexander Salazar (2004–2018)
 Joseph Vincent Brennan (2015–2019), appointed Bishop of Fresno
 Robert E. Barron (2015-2022) appointed Bishop of Winona-Rochester
 David G. O'Connell (2015–2023)

Other priests of the diocese who became bishops
Note: Years in parentheses indicate the time of service as a priest of the Archdiocese of Los Angeles (or predecessor diocese), prior to appointment to the episcopacy.
 Robert Emmet Lucey (1922–1934), appointed Bishop of Amarillo and later Archbishop of San Antonio
 John Thomas Steinbock (1963–1984), appointed Auxiliary Bishop of Orange and later Bishop of Fresno
 Justin F. Rigali (1961–1985), appointed President of the Pontifical Ecclesiastical Academy and later Secretary of the Congregation for Bishops and the College of Cardinals, Archbishop of Saint Louis, and Archbishop of Philadelphia (elevated to Cardinal in 2003)
 Michael Patrick Driscoll (1965–1989), appointed Auxiliary Bishop of Orange and later Bishop of Boise
 George Hugh Niederauer (1962–1994), appointed Bishop of Salt Lake City and Archbishop of San Francisco
 Dennis Patrick O'Neil (1966–2001), appointed Auxiliary Bishop of San Bernardino

Schools

There are 5 colleges and over 50 high schools within the Archdiocese of Los Angeles.  Many churches have affiliated primary schools as well.

Events

Religious education congress
The archdiocese's office of religious education produces the Los Angeles Religious Education Congress, the largest annual event of its kind in the United States, with an attendance of approximately 38,000.

Annual Marian procession and Mass
The archdiocese has entrusted the annual celebration of the Votive Mass in honor of Our Lady of the Angels to the Queen of Angels Foundation, a lay association of the Catholic Church founded by Mark Anchor Albert, dedicated to promoting devotion to the Blessed Virgin Mary. Each year since 2011, the Cathedral of Our Lady of the Angels has hosted a Votive Mass in honor of Our Lady, Queen of Angels. The Mass follows a Marian procession which originates from the historic Queen of Angels parish, which is part of the Los Angeles Plaza Historic District, and culminates at the cathedral.

Since 2011 the Queen of Angels Foundation has sponsored the annual Marian processions, Votive Masses, and fiestas in commemoration of Los Angeles' birthday and the feast of Our Lady of the Angels. Archbishop Gomez has been the homilist and principal celebrant of the annual Mass since 2012. Future Marian processions and Masses will coincide with the City of Los Angeles' official birthday celebrations on the last Saturday of August.

Holy days of obligation
As directed by the U.S. Conference of Catholic Bishops' Committee on the Liturgy and the Ecclesiastical Province of Los Angeles, the archdiocese annually observes four holy days of obligation. The Catholic Church currently recognizes 10 holy days, established in the 1917 Code of Canon Law. However, the USCCB has reduced that number to 6 for Latin Church dioceses in the United States. , no provinces in the United States celebrate the solemnities of Epiphany (which transfers to the Sunday after January 1), Corpus Christi (which transfers to the Sunday after Trinity Sunday), Saint Joseph, or the Saints Peter and Paul, Apostles as holy days of obligation. The solemnity of the Ascension is transferred from Thursday of the sixth week of Easter to the seventh Sunday of Easter. The province has abrogated the obligation to attend Mass on the Solemnity of Mary, Mother of God.
 Assumption of the Blessed Virgin Mary, August 15
 Exception: If August 15 falls on a Saturday or Monday, there is no obligation to attend Mass.
 All Saints, November 1
 Exception: If November 1 falls on a Saturday or Monday, there is no obligation to attend Mass.
 Immaculate Conception, December 8
 Exception: If December 8 falls on a Sunday, the solemnity is transferred to the following Monday and there is no obligation to attend Mass.
 Nativity of Our Lord Jesus Christ, December 25

Administrative handbook 
The Archdiocese of Los Angeles, being one of the most diverse dioceses in the world, strives for all of their employees to live and work in accord with Catholic social teaching and servant leadership. "The dignity of the human person, the call to community and participation, rights and responsibilities, dignity of work and the rights of workers, and solidarity, are intrinsic to servant leadership." In an attempt to provide better service and to increase transparency the Archdiocese of Los Angeles is the only archdiocese that has a completely updated and searchable administrative handbook available online.

Province of Los Angeles

See: List of the Catholic bishops of the United States

See also

 Catholic Church by country
 Catholic Church hierarchy
 List of churches in the Roman Catholic Archdiocese of Los Angeles
 List of schools in the Roman Catholic Archdiocese of Los Angeles
 List of the Catholic bishops of the United States
 List of the Catholic cathedrals of the United States
 List of the Catholic dioceses of the United States
 Queen of Angels Foundation

References

Further reading
 Caspary, Anita Marie. Witness to integrity: The crisis of the Immaculate Heart Community of California (Liturgical Press, 2003).
 Davis, Mike. City of Quartz: Excavating the Future in Los Angeles (1990, 2006) pp 323–72 on the Irish archbishops and their conflict with Latinos.
 Donovan, John T. "The 1960s Los Angeles Seminary Crisis." Catholic Historical Review 102.1 (2016): 69–96. summary
 DuBay, William H. The Priest and the Cardinal: Race and Rebellion in 1960s Los Angeles (CreateSpace, 2016).
 Lothrop, Gloria Ricci. "A Remarkable Legacy: The Story of Secondary Schools in the Archdiocese of Los Angeles." Catholic Historical Review 88.4 (2002): 809–810.
 Real, James. "Immaculate Heart of Hollywood." Change: The Magazine of Higher Learning 3.3 (1971): 48–53.
 Steidl, Jason. "The Unlikely Conversion of Father Juan Romero: Chicano Activism and Suburban Los Angeles Catholicism." US Catholic Historian 37.4 (2019): 29–52.
 Weber, Francis J. His Eminence of Los Angeles: James Francis Cardinal McIntyre (Mission Hills, Calif.: Saint Francis Historical Society, 1997).

Primary sources
 Sister Mary Rose Cunningham, C.S.C., ed. Calendar of Documents and Related Historical Materials in the Archival Center, Archdiocese of Los Angeles, for the Most Reverend J. Francis A. McIntyre, Volume One: 1948–1960 and Volume Two: 1961–1970 (1995)

External links

 Archdiocese of Los Angeles Official Site
 Los Angeles Religious Education Congress
 Cathedral of Our Lady of the Angels
 Cathedrals of California
 
 Queen of Angels Foundation
 2014 Grand Marian Procession & Mass

 
Christianity in Los Angeles
Organizations based in Los Angeles
Organizations based in Los Angeles County, California
Los Angeles
Los Angeles
1840 establishments in Alta California
1840 establishments in Mexico
Religious organizations established in 1840
Los Angeles